The temple is a latch where four skull bones fuse: the frontal, parietal, temporal, and sphenoid.  It is located on the side of the head behind the eye between the forehead and the ear. The temporal muscle covers this area and is used during mastication.

Cladists classify land vertebrates based on the presence of an upper hole, a lower hole, both, or neither in the cover of dermal bone that formerly covered the temporalis muscle, whose origin is the temple and whose insertion is the jaw. The brain has a lobe called the temporal lobe.

Etymology 
The word "temple" as used in anatomy has a separate etymology from the other meaning of word temple, meaning "place of worship". Due to its shared spelling (but not shared source) with the word for time, the adjective for both is "temporal" (both "pertaining to time" and "pertaining to the anatomical temple").

The name of the temporalis muscle looks like a form of the Latin word "tempus" meaning "time", but this is a coincidence and the two words do not come from the same root. However, this accidental resemblance of the words has been used as a memory aid in the study of anatomy; the hair of the head near this bone is often the first hair to turn gray during the aging process, thus obliquely relating this area of the head with the concept of time. Some sources erroneously present the coincidental resemblance as if it was etymological fact.

See also
Pterion, the weakest part of the skull

References

External links

Human head and neck
Vertebrate anatomy